Antanas Valionis (born September 21, 1950) is a Lithuanian politician, currently a member of the New Union party.

He was appointed the Lithuanian Minister of Foreign Affairs on October 30, 2000, and reappointed on July 5, 2001. He resigned on August 31, 2006.

From 1981 he served in the Soviet secret police KGB in Riga reaching the rank of captain. Afterwards he served in the KGB active reserve.

References

External links 
Antanas Valionis, the Soviet KGB Captain in reserve

1950 births
KGB officers
Lithuanian communists
Living people
Ministers of Foreign Affairs of Lithuania
Recipients of the Order of the Cross of Terra Mariana, 1st Class
Ambassadors of Lithuania to Poland
Ambassadors of Lithuania to Bulgaria
21st-century Lithuanian politicians
New Union (Social Liberals) politicians
People from Kėdainiai District Municipality